Vincenzo Pedicone (born 22 March 1956) is an Italian weightlifter. He competed in the men's middleweight event at the 1980 Summer Olympics.

References

External links
 

1956 births
Living people
Italian male weightlifters
Olympic weightlifters of Italy
Weightlifters at the 1980 Summer Olympics
Sportspeople from the Province of Teramo
20th-century Italian people